Smrdelje is a small village located 8 km southwest of Kistanje, in the continental part of Šibenik-Knin County, Croatia.

The broader area of the village comprises several prehistoric tumuli. The remains of Roman architecture are found on two localities, as well as several graves from the early Croatian period. The largest graveyard was on a place called Debeljak, where the Croatian pagan burials from the 8th or 9th century have been established. The archaeological site also includes early Croatian graves from the 9th or 10th century.

References

Populated places in Šibenik-Knin County
Archaeological sites in Croatia
Serb communities in Croatia